This article includes current squads of Germany U-19, U-18, U-17, U-16 and U-15 national football teams.

Main coaches

Germany national under-19 squad
 The following players were called up for the friendly matches.
 Match dates: 23, 26 and 29 November 2022
 Opposition: ,  and Caps and goals correct as of: 26 November 2022, after the match against .

Germany national under-17 squad
Current squad
 The following players were called up for the friendly matches.
 Match dates: 25 and 28 November 2022
 Opposition: 
Caps and goals correct as of: 25 November 2022, after the match against .

Recent call-ups
The following players have been called up to the squad within the last twelve months and remain eligible for selection.

Records

FIFA U-17 World Cup
 Runners-up (19851)
 Third place (2007, 2011)
 Fourth place (1997)
 Golden Ball (Toni Kroos, 2007)

UEFA European Under-19 Football Championship
 Winner (19652, 19702, 19811, 19862, 2008, 2014)
 Runners-up (19541, 19692, 19721, 19732, 1994, 1998, 2002)

UEFA European Under-17 Football Championship
 Winner (19841, 1992, 2009)
 Runners-up (19821, 19892, 1991, 2011, 2012, 2015)
 Third place (19882, 1995, 1997, 1999)
 Fourth place (19852, 19862, 19881, 2006)

Awards

FIFA U-17 World Cup

Individual
 Golden Ball: Toni Kroos (2007)
 Golden Shoe: Marcel Witeczek (1985)

Team
 FIFA Fair Play Award: 1985

UEFA European Under-19 Football Championship

Individual
 Golden Player: Lars Bender (2008), Sven Bender (2008), Davie Selke (2014)
 Top Goalscorer: Änis Ben-Hatira (2007), Davie Selke (2014)

UEFA European Under-17 Football Championship

Individual
 Golden Player: Toni Kroos (2006), Mario Götze (2008), Max Meyer (2012)
 Top Goalscorer: Manuel Fischer (2006), Toni Kroos (2007), Lennart Thy (2009), Samed Yeşil (2011), Max Meyer (2012)

See also
 Germany national football team
 Germany national under-21 football team
 Germany national under-16 football team
 FIFA U-20 World Cup
 FIFA U-17 World Cup
 UEFA European Under-19 Championship
 UEFA European Under-17 Championship

Notes
 1 = as West Germany
 2 = as East Germany

References

External links
 Germany Youth National Teams

Youth football in Germany
Football
National youth association football teams